Bill Mays at Maybeck: Maybeck Recital Hall Series Volume Twenty-Six is an album of solo performances by jazz pianist Bill Mays.

Music and recording
The album was recorded at the Maybeck Recital Hall in Berkeley, California in September 1992. Most of the material is swing standards.

Release and reception

The AllMusic reviewer recommended one track in particular: "'A Nightingale Sang in Berkeley Square' (which starts and ends with a very impressionistic fantasy, making one wonder if its swinging middle section was indeed a dream) is most memorable". The Penguin Guide to Jazz wrote that the standards were played with imagination, but that some of the other tracks were lacking expression.

Track listing

Personnel
Bill Mays – piano

References

Albums recorded at the Maybeck Recital Hall
Solo piano jazz albums